The 2000–01 Eredivisie season was the 41st season of the Eredivisie in basketball, the highest professional basketball league in the Netherlands. Ricoh Astronauts won their 3rd national title.

Regular season
Each side played teams in their own group four times (twice home and twice away), while they played teams from other groups two times (once home and once away).

Group A

Group B

Playoffs

Bracket

Finals

Individual awards 

 Most Valuable Player: Chris McGuthrie (Ricoh Astronauts)
 Coach of the Year: Ton Boot (Ricoh Astronauts)
 Rookie of the Year: Sydmill Harris (Ricoh Astronauts)
 First-team All-Eredivisie:
 Ryan Robertson (EiffelTowers Nijmegen)
 Hakeem Ward (Den Helder)
 Joe Spinks (Ricoh Astronauts)
 Eric Nelson (EiffelTowers Nijmegen)
 Lamont Randolph (MPC Donar)

Individual statistical leaders

References 

Dutch Basketball League seasons
Netherlands
1